Francesco Capuano Di Manfredonia (flourished 15th century) was an Italian astronomer, professor, and member of the clergy. Up until the 1880s (at the earliest) there wasn't a lot known about Capuano, and the little bit that was known was derived directly from his printed works.

Capuano was born in Manfredonia, Italy, likely in the first half of the fifteenth century. He was a published professor of astronomy at Padua, Republic of Venice, where he published commentary on Peuerbach's Theoricae planetarium in August of 1495. This commentary was dedicated to Ferninand II of Naples. He wrote an influential commentary on the work Tractatus de Sphaera by Johannes de Sacrobosco, which was printed in late 1499 in Venice, Italy. This commentary was dedicated to Lorenzo Donato (Donà), and reprinted six times, up through 1531, some of which are under the name Giovanni Battista. Capuano is most regarded for his work on Tractatus de Sphaera, which is usually published with other texts on Tractatus de Sphaera from various authors. This opens Capuano's commentary to be read in conjunction with works of different nature.

It is commonly held that Capuano died in Naples, Italy around 1490, but records, such as his publication on Peuerbach's Theroicae planetarium and documents preserved in the Padua archives, show that he was very much alive throughout the early to mid 1500s. Writings by Paolo Sambin under the title Professori di astronomia e matematica a Padova nell’ultimo decennio del Quattrocento describe events from Capuano's life after his alleged death date. Sambin sourced this material from documents preserved in the Padua archives. On November 6, 1494, Francesco Capuano submitted a request alongside another Apulian scholar, Girolamo Palmieri da Ostuni, in which they asked for a reduction in fees for their examination and proclamation ceremony. They requested that at least one of their fees be waved due to their poverty status and the war that was going on at the time. Their request was granted, and on November 12, 1494 Capuano passed his exam in the arts and medicine. He was honored with 'doctoral insignias' at his graduation ceremony on November 15, 1494. 

He became known as Giovanni Battista following his entrance into the ranks of the Canons Regular of the Lateran (CRL). Subsequently, he became a bishop after joining the congregation. Another alias associated with Capuano is Iohannes Baptista Capuanus si Pontinus, de Manfredonia.  Although the exact timeline remains uncertain, it is speculated that Capuano began his religious life between 1508 and 1518, based on the dedications of his written works. After becoming a clergyman, Capuano rededicated his commentary on Tractatus de Sphaera to his fellow members of the CRL. 

On Giovanni Battista Riccioli's 17th century lunar map, a lunar impact crater on the southern edge of the Palus Epidemiarum was named Capuanus after Frencesco Capuano.

References

15th-century Italian astronomers
1490 deaths
Year of birth missing
15th-century Italian writers